The 2019 Reno 1868 FC season is the club's third season of existence and their third in the United Soccer League Championship, the second tier of American soccer .

Current roster

Current staff

Competitions

Exhibitions
All times in Pacific Time

USL Championship

Standings

Results 
On December 19, 2018, the USL announced their 2019 season schedule.

All times in Pacific Time

USL Cup Playoffs

U.S. Open Cup

As a member of the USL Championship, Reno 1868 FC will enter the tournament in the Second Round, to be played May 14–15, 2019, with the pairing announced on April 17.

References 

Reno 1868 FC
Reno 1868 FC
Reno 1868 FC seasons
Reno 1868 FC